James Michael Lafferty (born 1963) is an American businessman, speaker, consultant, psychologist, and social media influencer. He is known for his story of starting as a fitness trainer in the Procter & Gamble Company in 1984 and progressing through marketing to become a division CEO for P&G, Coca-Cola, and British American Tobacco.

He is also an Olympic athletics coach, keynote speaker and trainer, columnist, and women's rights advocate. Further, he is a marathon runner, an honorary coach, and consultant at the Philippine Amateur Track and Field Association, and on the board of the Medical Wellness Association. He supports Filipino orphans and women's empowerment programs around the world. He transformed the management board of Fine Hygienic Holding,  where he currently serves as the CEO, to include 30% female members.

Personal life 
James Michael Lafferty is married to Carol Lafferty and has six children - Michael, Morgan, Kristen, John-Patrick, Kenji and Mikayla.  Kenji is Lafferty's only adopted child. Kenji was an abandoned Filipino orphan, and after a period of foster care with the Lafferty family, was officially adopted by them.

Education 
Lafferty graduated from St. Xavier High School in Cincinnati in 1981. He graduated from the University of Cincinnati with a bachelor's degree in psychology and physiology (1985).

Career 
Coaching

Lafferty started off his career as a corporate fitness trainer. As a professional track and field coach, he has coached Olympic-level track and field athletes in the United States, Nigeria, and the Philippines for the Rio 2016 Olympic Games. He also coached the Nigerian marathon team in the 2012 London Olympics.

He coached 3-time Olympian long jumper, Marestella Sunang who returned from childbirth in 2014 to set a new national record in the 2016 Rio de Janeiro Olympics and provided her with a team doctor, strength coach, masseuse, dietician and sports psychologist, among others.

Lafferty has also coached Ernest Obiena, Esther Obiekwe, and Kristy Abello - all national level athletes in their various countries. He has co-founded a marathon titled, “The Bull Runner Dream Marathon” which takes place every year.

Business

James Michael Lafferty is currently the CEO of Fine Hygienic Holding. He joined the FHH Board of Directors and officially began his duties as the CEO in April 2018.

Lafferty began his career in 1985 with Procter & Gamble, sprinting through various strategic leadership roles that include General Manager for the Near East region, chief executive officer of P&G for Poland and the Baltic States, Vice President of Paper in Western Europe, and CEO of the company's operations in the Philippines.

After Procter & Gamble, Lafferty continued his career journey as the CEO of Coca-Cola Nigeria and as the CEO of British American Tobacco in the Philippines. He also worked as a consultant for P&G, Coca-Cola, HP, Newell Rubbermaid, Nestlé, Microsoft, Intuit, L'Oreal, General Electric, Hershey, Wal-Mart and many other Fortune 500 companies.

Teacher and Columnist

Lafferty is a regular columnist for The Philippine Star and teaches at the University of the Philippines, Ateneo de Manila University and De La Salle University.

His column on “Why Diversity is still a business challenge” was a finalist under the CMMA Best Business Column category.

Philanthropy 
Adopt an Olympian program

Lafferty aimed to gather CEOs for his “Adopt an Olympian” program. The objective of the program was to help the country win the elusive gold, preferably as early as 2016. With the help of the program, one CEO funds the full range training of one Filipino athlete. Along with financial support, the program assists in the setting up of an entire system involving selection and hiring of a coach, yoga instructor, dietician, sports psychologist, as well as the design of an appropriate training program.

Administering CPR at the airport

Lafferty was widely covered by Filipino media after he saved the life of a stranger, Romeo Silva, in October 2006. Lafferty administered CPR after the man collapsed at the Nagoya Airport, Japan due to a heart attack.

Team Obiena Pledges P500K Donation to Lydia de Vega

James together with his wife Carol, and EJ Obiena Pledge a PHP 500,000 donation to the sprint queen Lydia de Vega who was battling cancer. James and Carol are EJ's long time supporters, advisors and Nutritionist.

Media 
James Michael Lafferty has appeared on The Chrissy B Show, SKY 203, sharing his thoughts about the qualities needed to succeed.

He has also been interviewed by Barbara Be about how he started his career and reached the position he is in today. The interview was titled "Climbing the Ladder". He also appeared on Expat Insights with Raju Mandhyan where he talked about winners and champions. He was a speaker at AESC and Tissue World 2005.

Publications

Articles 
Lafferty (May 7, 2022). Truth Be Bold. Brainfeed Magazine
Lafferty (May 7, 2022). Making the World Better Place to Live in.Theincmagazine
Lafferty (July 15, 2022). Helping Organization Reach Full Potential. Cxooutlook 
Lafferty (August 15, 2022) James Machael Lafferty: The visionary Leader Challenging the Health and Wellness Industry.Theledersglobe
Lafferty (May 28, 2019) What Sport can teach Business about 'Winners' Versus 'Champions.Arabianbusiness 
Lafferty (November 3, 2020). The Winning Leadership Mantra; Mr. James Michael Lafferty. Mywestford

Speech 
Winners to Champions’ by James Michael Laffert 
2018 Middle East Edition of Break the Ceiling Touch the Sky-The Success and Leadership Summit for Women Announces Final Speakers

Awards and Recognition 
Lafferty has been awarded CEO of the year 21 separate times in his career by various organisations and government-affiliated associations, as of 2021. Lafferty is the winner of the 2019 Burj CEO Of the year Middle East Award as well as GCC 2019 CEO of the year, and Daman Corporate Health and Wellness Visionary 2019 Award. He has been listed in the 2019 Top 50 International CEOs list by Forbes Middle East, and Best CEO of the Year 2022 in the Wellness and Hygienic Products sector.

The following table lists the awards Lafferty obtained:

References

1963 births
American businesspeople
Living people
American consultants
21st-century American psychologists
University of Cincinnati alumni
St. Xavier High School (Ohio) alumni
20th-century American psychologists